Dan Hung Barouch is an American physician, immunologist, and virologist. He is known for his work on the pathogenesis and immunology of viral infections and the development of vaccine strategies for global infectious diseases.

Education and career
Dan Barouch received his B.A. in biochemistry from Harvard University summa cum laude in 1993. In 1995, he received his Ph.D. in immunology from Oxford University as a Marshall Scholar. In 1999, he received his M.D. from Harvard Medical School summa cum laude. He completed clinical residency training in internal medicine and fellowship training in infectious diseases at Massachusetts General Hospital and Brigham and Women's Hospital in Boston.
Barouch is a professor of medicine and professor of immunology at Harvard Medical School. In 2012, he was named the founding director of the Center for Virology and Vaccine Research at Beth Israel Deaconess Medical Center in Boston. He is also a founding member and a steering committee member at the Ragon Institute of Massachusetts General Hospital, Massachusetts Institute of Technology, and Harvard University. He was appointed the William Bosworth Castle Professor of Medicine at Harvard Medical School in 2020.

HIV research
Barouch started HIV research while he was still in medical school and launched his independent research laboratory at age 29. He has developed several vaccination platforms, including adjuvanted DNA vaccines and adenoviral vectors.

In 2000, Barouch began researching the development of an HIV vaccine. In 2002, he published that a candidate HIV vaccine can suppress virus in preclinical studies for a period of two years.  In 2006, he developed a vaccine vector that was not suppressed by preexisting immunity.  His research between 2004 and 2019 provided the scientific foundation for the Johnson & Johnson HIV vaccine candidate, including the creation of a set of "mosaic" proteins with Bette Korber, which improve immune responses against multiple strains of the virus.  From 2015 to 2018, Barouch co-led the HIV-V-0004 APPROACH study, testing the mosaic Ad26/Env vaccine in human subjects. This vaccine was then advanced into clinical efficacy trials in Africa, North America, South America, and Europe with the National Institutes of Health, the Bill & Melinda Gates Foundation, Janssen, and others.

Barouch has also worked on immunologic strategies to cure HIV infection. In 2016 and 2018, he demonstrated the potential of combining therapeutic vaccines or broadly neutralizing antibodies with immune activators, also known as the "shock and kill" strategy. Barouch has also discussed his research and has commented on the research of others in the media.

Zika research
In 2016, Barouch developed and tested the first Zika vaccines in preclinical studies. These vaccines entered first-in-human trials later that year.

COVID-19 research 
Barouch's laboratory collaborated with Johnson and Johnson to develop a non-replicating adenovirus COVID-19 vaccine candidate that entered clinical trials in July 2020 and is one of the five major vaccine efforts supported by the US government.

In February 2021 Barouch co-authored a paper in Nature Communications on how a certain level of COVID-19 anti-bodies may provide lasting protection against the virus. The paper was based on blood samples provided voluntarily by 4300 employees of SpaceX crediting also its CEO Elon Musk.

Societies and awards
In 2009, Barouch was elected to the American Society for Clinical Investigation. In 2013, he became a member of the Association of American Physicians. In 2016, Barouch was named honorary researcher at the centre de Recherche, Centre hospitalier de l'Université de Montréal and was named a Bostonian of the Year by the Boston Globe Magazine. In 2017, Barouch was named the Investigator of the Year by the Massachusetts Society for Medical Research and received the Drexel Prize in Immunology from the Drexel University College of Medicine. In 2019, Barouch received the Best Academic Research Team Vaccine Industry Excellence Award at the World Vaccine Congress.

References

Harvard Medical School faculty
Alumni of the University of Oxford
Year of birth missing (living people)
Harvard College alumni
American virologists
American immunologists
Living people
HIV/AIDS researchers
Marshall Scholars
Harvard Medical School alumni
Members of the National Academy of Medicine